"We Three Kings", original title "Three Kings of Orient", also known as "We Three Kings of Orient Are" or "The Quest of the Magi", is a Christmas carol that was written by John Henry Hopkins Jr. in 1857. At the time of composing the carol, Hopkins served as the rector of Christ Episcopal Church in Williamsport, Pennsylvania, and he wrote the carol for a Christmas pageant in New York City. It was the first widely popular Christmas carol written in America.

Lyrics

Composition

Source

John Henry Hopkins Jr. organized the carol in such a way that three male voices would each sing a solo verse in order to correspond with the three kings. The first and last verses of the carol are sung together by all three as "verses of praise", while the intermediate verses are sung individually with each king describing the gift he was bringing. The refrain proceeds to praise the beauty of the Star of Bethlehem. The Magi's solos are typically not observed during contemporary performances of the carol.

The carol's melody has been described as "sad" and "shifting" in nature. Because of this, it highly resembles a song from the Middle Ages and Middle Eastern music, both of which it has been frequently compared to.

Context
The carol centres around the Biblical Magi, who visited Jesus as a child in a house sometime after his Nativity and gave him gifts of gold, frankincense and myrrh while paying homage to him. Though the event is recounted in the Gospel of Matthew, there are no further details given in the New Testament with regards to their names, the number of Magi that were present or whether they were even royal. There are, however, verses in the Old Testament that foretell of the visitors. Isaiah 60:6: "The wealth of the nations will come to you. A multitude of camels will cover you. The young camels of Midian and Ephah; All those from Sheba will come; They will bring gold and frankincense, and will bear good news of the praises of the Lord." (New American Standard Bible), and two selections from the Psalms – Psalm 72:10: "The kings of Tarshish and of the isles shall pay tribute, and the kings of Arabia and Saba offer gifts" and Psalm 72:15: "...and may there be given to him gold from Arabia" (New American Standard Bible). Hence, the names of the Magi—Melchior, Caspar and Balthazar—and their status as kings from the Orient are legendary and based on tradition. The number three stems from the fact that there were three separate gifts that were given.

Background and influence
At the time he was writing "We Three Kings" in 1857, John Henry Hopkins Jr. was serving as the rector of Christ Episcopal Church in Williamsport, Pennsylvania. Although he originally worked as a journalist for a New York newspaper and studied to become a lawyer, he chose to join the clergy upon graduating from the University of Vermont. Hopkins studied at the General Theological Seminary in New York City and after graduating and being ordained a deacon in 1850, he became its first music teacher five years later, holding the post until 1857 alongside his ministry in the Episcopal Church.

During his final year of teaching at the seminary, Hopkins wrote "We Three Kings" for a Christmas pageant held at the college. It was noteworthy that Hopkins composed both the lyrics and music; contemporary carol composers usually wrote either the lyrics or music but not both. Originally titled "Three Kings of Orient", it was sung within his circle of family and friends. Because of the popularity it achieved among them, Hopkins decided to publish the carol in 1863 in his book Carols, Hymns, and Songs. It was the first Christmas carol originating from the United States to achieve widespread popularity, as well as the first to be featured in Christmas Carols Old and New, a collection of carols that was published in the United Kingdom. In 1916, the carol was printed in the hymnal for the Episcopal Church; that year's edition was the first to have a separate section for Christmas songs. "We Three Kings" was also included in The Oxford Book of Carols published in 1928, which praised the song as "one of the most successful of modern composed carols".

In popular music
Jazz, rock, and reggae musicians recorded "We Three Kings".
Percy Faith (1958)
Ramsey Lewis (1964)
The Beach Boys (1964)
Jethro Tull (2003) "We Five Kings"
Blondie (2009)

Parodies
Since the 1950s, the carol has been frequently parodied by children. The subject of the lyrics vary widely depending upon the region, with references to smoking explosive rubber cigars, selling counterfeit lingerie, or travelling to an Irish bar by taxi, car, and scooter.

See also
 List of Christmas carols

References

Further reading

External links
 
 "We Three Kings of Orient Are", images of early editions of the carol and historical information, hymnsandcarolsofchristmas.com
 Sheet music, Cantorion.org

Christmas carols
Songs about kings
American Christmas songs
Cultural depictions of the Biblical Magi
Epiphany music